Lake Gibson High School is located in Lakeland, Florida, and was established in 1979.

Athletics 
Lake Gibson offers a wide variety of sports for boys and girls including:  Baseball, boys and girls basketball, boys and girls cross country, weightlifting, competitive cheer, football, boys and girls golf, boys and girls soccer, boys and girls swimming, softball, boys and girls track, boys and girls tennis, wrestling, girls volleyball, boys lacrosse and girls lacrosse

Facts 
 Garnet and gold are the LGHS school colors.
 The LGHS mascot is a Native American (Brave).
Fight song is the same as the Florida State University Garnet and Gold March.

Notable alumni
 Sean Barber, Major League Baseball (MLB) umpire
 Lance Davis, Former MLB player (Cincinnati Reds)
 Adarius Glanton, NFL player
 Matt Grothe, played quarterback for the University of South Florida and is a 2005 Alumnus
 JD Harmeyer, media producer for The Howard Stern Show
 Bilal Powell, football running back. ( New York Jets )
 Chris Waters, Former MLB player (Baltimore Orioles)
 Keydrick Vincent, NFL player, Baltimore Ravens
 Jason Watkins, graduated class of 2004 and played for the University of Florida
 Donald Parham, football tight end. (Los Angeles Chargers)

References

External links 
LGHS Homepage
LGHS band Homepage
LGHS Football Homepage

High schools in Polk County, Florida
Educational institutions established in 1979
Schools in Lakeland, Florida
1979 establishments in Florida